Hastings Boys' High School is a boys' secondary school in Hastings, New Zealand. The school is part of the Super 8. The school was founded in 1904 as Hastings High School. In 1922, it became Hastings Technical School under the leadership of William Penlington, who remained headmaster until 1949.

In the mid-1950s, the school split into Hastings Girls' High School and Hastings Boys' School. It has four Houses, Te Mata (red), Heretaunga (blue), Te Kahu (grey) and Manu Huia (black). These houses compete in many sporting events with each other throughout the year.

Students at Hastings Boys' High School organised a conference in 1999 to consider cloning the Huia, their school emblem. The Maori tribe Ngati Huia agreed, in principle, to support the endeavour, which would be carried out at the University of Otago, and a California-based Internet start-up volunteered $100,000 of funding. The cloning did not ultimately take place.

Notable alumni 

John Collinge – former president of the New Zealand National Party and High Commissioner to the United Kingdom
Neil Dawson (born 1948), sculptor
Hika Elliot – All Black
Bob Fenton (born 1923) – National MP for Hastings (1975–1978)
Tohu Harris – NZ Kiwi's, Melbourne Storm
Moana Jackson  (1945–2022), lawyer
Sydney Jones (1894–1982), National MP for Hastings (1949–1954)
Phil Judd (born 1953) – composer, songwriter, musician, producer, performer and visual artist
Josh Kronfeld –  All Black
Danny Lee – All Black
George Lowe – mountaineer, including 1953 Everest expedition
Ross McEwan – CEO National Australia Bank
Hubert McLean – All Black
Alby Mathewson – All Black
Bruce Robertson – All Black
Roger Randle – All Black
Kevin Tamati – NZ Kiwi's
Paora Winitana – NZ Breakers

Notes

References

Boys' schools in New Zealand
Secondary schools in the Hawke's Bay Region
Schools in Hastings, New Zealand
1904 establishments in New Zealand
Educational institutions established in 1904